Town of Halifax Court House Historic District is a national historic district located at Halifax, Halifax County, Virginia. The district includes 172 contributing buildings, 1 contributing site, 13 contributing structures, and 1 contributing object (Confederate War Memorial, 1911) in the Town of Halifax.  Resources include government, commercial, residential, religious, educational and industrial buildings that date from the early-19th Century to the mid-20th century.  Notable buildings include the Rice House (c. 1812), Edmunds/Lewis Office (1869), People's Bank (c. 1911), Beth Car Baptist Church (1892), Christ
Episcopal Church (c. 1907), Saint Luke's Christian Methodist Episcopal Church (c. 1907), Dr. Carter House (c. 1900), County Office Building (1915), Town of Halifax Swimming Pool (1930s), Municipal
Building/ Fire Station (1950), Halifax Roller Mills (1915), Halifax Planing Mill (c. 1920), Halifax Department Store (1949), and Randolph Theater (c. 1948).  Also located in the district is the separately listed Halifax County Courthouse.

It was listed on the National Register of Historic Places in 2011.

Gallery

References

Historic districts in Halifax County, Virginia
National Register of Historic Places in Halifax County, Virginia
Historic districts on the National Register of Historic Places in Virginia